Men on Her Mind is a 1944 musical drama film directed by Wallace Fox, produced by Alfred Stern. The screenplay was written by Raymond L. Schrock. The film stars Mary Beth Hughes, Edward Norris and Ted North.

Plot

Lily Durrell (Mary Beth Hughes) is a radio and nightclub singer who has worked hard, and values her status as a star.  Although she ponders her orphan 'rags-to-riches' past, she's also considering the idea of being involved with a romantic male companion.  She tries to determine which of the 3 suitors would be best for her.

Cast
Mary Beth Hughes as  Lily Durrell 
Edward Norris as  Jeffrey Wingate 
Ted North as  Jim Lacey 
Alan Edwards as  Roland Palmer 
Luis Alberni as  Alberti Verdi 
Kay Linaker as  Eloise Palmer 
Claire Rochelle as  Mayme Munson 
Lyle Latell as  Big Joe Munroe 
Claire McDowell as  Mayme Munson 
Eva Hamill as  Gracie Tuttle 
Isabel La Mal as  Miss Wiggins 
Lane Chandler as  Frank Tuttle

External links

1944 films
American black-and-white films
1940s musical drama films
American musical drama films
Films directed by Wallace Fox
Producers Releasing Corporation films
1944 drama films
1940s American films